Dimitrios Karakasis was a Greek physician.

He was born in Siatista in 1734. He went to Halle, in Saxony, where he studied medicine, philosophy and mathematics. He took a Degree in medicine in 1760. He exercised his occupation as physician in Vienna, Larisa, Siatista, Kozani, Bucharest, and also taught in his birthplace, Siatista, in Macedonia.

See also 
List of Macedonians (Greek)

External links 
List of Great Macedonians (15th-19th century)

1734 births
Year of death unknown
People from Siatista
Greek Macedonians
18th-century Greek physicians
18th-century physicians from the Ottoman Empire
Macedonia under the Ottoman Empire
18th-century Greek educators